Arnaud Viala (born 4 December 1974) is a French politician of the Republicans who was Member of Parliament for the Aveyron's 3rd constituency in the French National Assembly from 2015 to 2021.

Political career
In Parliament, Viala serves on the Committee on Legal Affairs. In addition to his committee assignments, he is a member of the French Parliamentary Friendship Groups with Central America and Central Asia.

In the Republicans' 2016 presidential primaries, Viala endorsed Alain Juppé as the party's candidate for the office of President of France. In the Republicans' 2017 leadership election, he endorsed Laurent Wauquiez.

In 2021 he resigned from parliament to become president of the Departmental Council of Aveyron.

See also
 2017 French legislative election

References

1974 births
Living people
People from Millau
Deputies of the 15th National Assembly of the French Fifth Republic
The Republicans (France) politicians
Members of Parliament for Aveyron